The Faculty of Law of Eötvös Loránd University was founded in 1667 and it is located in Egyetem tér in Belváros-Lipótváros, Budapest, Hungary.

History
The Faculty of Law was founded in 1667, 32 years later the foundation of Eötvös Loránd University. Between 1667 and 1872, law education was only at the Faculty of Law in Hungary. Since the foundation of the Babeș-Bolyai University (at that time called Franz Joseph University) in 1872, there had been more universities offering courses on law. 

Since the nineteenth century, there had been a high quality of law education attributed to the following educators: Gusztáv Wenzel, Jenő Balogh, Győző Concha, László Fayer, Béni Grosschmid, Sándor Plósz, Gusztáv Szászy-Schwarz, and Tamás Vécsey. For a long time, the professors of the Faculyt were at the same time members of the Hungarian Academy of Sciences.  

In 1900 the edifice of the Faculty was inaugurated. The building was designed by Sándor Baumgarten and Zsigmond Herczegh.

Between World War I and World War II, there had been high quality of education related to the following professors: Ferenc Eckhart, László Gajzágó, Zoltán Magyary, Géza Marton, Gyula Moór, Ákos Navratil, Endre Nizsalovszky, and Károly Szladits.

In 1948, several changes were implemented following the principles of Socialism causing damages to the entire structure of the Faculty. These changes included the introduction of the obligatory seminars, the structure of the Faculty, the foundation of student associations etc.

In 1987, Viktor Orbán graduated from the Faculty. During his studies at the Faculty, he also founded the journal Szászadvég.

Miklós Király, Dean of the Faculty, wrote an open letter to Viktor Orbán in connection with the situation of the Central European University.

Departments
There are 16 departments at the Faculty of Law. Apart from 16 departments, there is one institute and one lectorate.

Organisation

Faculty leadership

Deans 
 Attila Harmathy
 Lajos Ficzere
 Miklós Király (1 July 2008 – 1 July 2016)
 Attila Menyhárd (1 July 2016 – 1 July 2019)
 Pál Sonnevend (1 July 2019 –)

Programs

The university currently offers three Master programs in English: Master in European and international business law, Master in European human rights, and Master in international and European taxation. There are two doctoral schools at the Faculty of Law and Political Sciencies: the Doctoral School of Law and the Doctoral School of Political Science.

Notable researchers

Notable alumni
In parentheses, the year the degree was obtained.

János Áder, former President of Hungary
Peter Bakonyi, Hungarian-born Canadian Olympic foil and épée fencer
István Balsai, politician
György Bónis, lawyer
Gyula Budai, politician
Gábor Demszky, former Mayor of Budapest
Tamás Deutsch, politician
Klára Dobrev, politician
Alajos Dornbach, lawyer and politician
Dóra Dúró, politician
Tibor Farkas, jurist
András Fekete-Győr, politician
Tamás Fellegi, politician
Gábor Fodor, politician
Árpád Göncz, former President of Hungary
Csaba Gyüre, politician
János Halmos, lawyer
Balázs Horváth, politician
Csaba Hende, politician and former Minister of Defence
Francisc Hossu-Longin, Romanian lawyer
Gergely Karácsony, current Mayor of Budapest
László Kelemen, attorney and writer
Imre Kónya, politician
László Kövér, politician
László Krasznahorkai, novelist
Kálmán Kulcsár, politician and jurist and former Minister of Justice
László György Lukács, lawyer and politician
György Magyar, lawyer, politician, and professor
Simeon Mangiuca, Romanian folklorist
László Majtényi, jurist and university professor
Rodion Markovits, journalist, writer, and lawyer
Gábor Máthé
Ferenc Mádl, former President of Hungary
Krisztina Morvai, politician
Tibor Navracsics, politician
János Németh, jurist
Lajos Oláh, politician
Balázs Orbán, politician
Viktor Orbán, Prime Minister of Hungary
Csaba Őry, politician
Sándor Pintér, politician
Péter Róna, economist and lawyer
Endre Ságvári, lawyer and activist
András Schiffer, lawyer and politician
István Simicskó, politician
László Sólyom, politician and former President of Hungary
István Stumpf, politician (1982)
János Szabó, politician and Minister of Defence between 1998 and 2002
József Szájer, politician
Kristóf Szatmáry, politician
Dezső Szilágyi, politician
András Tasnádi Nagy, politician
József Torgyán, politician
László Trócsányi, lawyer
Béla Turi-Kovács, politician
Ferenc A. Váli, lawyer
Pál Völner, jurist and politician
Sándor Wekerle, politician

Honorary doctorates 

 Sauli Niinistö, President of Finland

Library 
The Library of the Faculty of Law is located in Egyetem tér.

Gallery

References

External links

 

Eötvös Loránd University
1635 establishments in the Habsburg monarchy
17th-century establishments in Hungary
Belváros-Lipótváros